Frederick Riley Cooke (28 April 1867 – 26 June 1930) was a New Zealand tailor, socialist and trade unionist.

Early life
Cooke was born in Leeds, Yorkshire, England on 28 April 1867. He started his working life aged seven and was almost entirely self-educated. He married Ida Clough on 1 August 1891 in Bradford, where he was living at the time.

Political career
He came to New Zealand in 1900 and was a founding member of Socialist Party.

At the unity conference in 1913, Cooke was a forceful opponent of compulsory military training. The Socialist Party merged with United Labour Party at that conference to form the Social Democratic Party, and Cooke was elected vice president in 1914, and president in 1915. In 1916, the Social Democratic Party merged to become the Labour Party. Cooke was Labour's vice president (1920/1921) and president (1921/22). He was a member of Christchurch City Council from a by-election in 1920 onwards.

Cooke died in Christchurch on 26 June 1930; he had suffered from diabetes for the last decade and had developed prostate cancer. He was buried at Sydenham Cemetery. Addresses were given at the funeral by Ted Howard (MP), Peter Fraser (MP), John Archer (Mayor of Christchurch), and Jack McCullough (trade unionist).

Notes

References

|-

1867 births
1930 deaths
New Zealand trade unionists
New Zealand socialists
English emigrants to New Zealand
People from Christchurch
Politicians from Leeds
New Zealand Labour Party politicians
Social Democratic Party (New Zealand) politicians
New Zealand Socialist Party politicians
Burials at Sydenham Cemetery
Unsuccessful candidates in the 1905 New Zealand general election
Unsuccessful candidates in the 1908 New Zealand general election
Unsuccessful candidates in the 1911 New Zealand general election
Unsuccessful candidates in the 1922 New Zealand general election
Unsuccessful candidates in the 1925 New Zealand general election
Unsuccessful candidates in the 1928 New Zealand general election
Christchurch City Councillors